Lesbian, gay, bisexual, and transgender (LGBT) rights in Colombia are among the most advanced in the Americas and throughout the world, and have substantially progressed since consensual homosexual activity was decriminalized in 1981. Between February 2007 and April 2008, three rulings of the Constitutional Court granted registered same-sex couples the same pension, social security and property rights as registered heterosexual couples. In 2011, Congress passed a law banning discrimination based on sexual orientation, and on 28 April 2016, the Constitutional Court legalized same-sex marriage, making Colombia the fourth South American country to do so.

Constitution and law
Article 13 of the Colombian Constitution of 1991 states that "the State will provide conditions for the equality to be real and effective, and will adopt measures in favour of marginalised or discriminated groups."

Article 42 of the Constitution states "the family is the basic nucleus of society. It is formed on the basis of natural or legal ties, by the free decision of a man and woman to contract matrimony or by their responsible resolve to comply with it".

Law reforms in the 1990s equalized the age of consent in Colombia at 14 for both homosexual and heterosexual sex. In 1998, the Constitutional Court ruled that public school teachers cannot be fired for revealing their sexual orientation, nor can private religious schools ban gay students from enrolling. In 1999, the same court unanimously ruled that the armed forces could not ban homosexuals and bisexuals from serving, being a violation of constitutional guarantees of "personal and family intimacy" and "the free development of one's personality."

Recognition of same-sex relationships

On 7 February 2007, the Colombian Constitutional Court extended property and inheritance rights to same-sex couples, as a result of a constitutional action presented by the public interest law group of the Universidad de los Andes. The decision did not include pension or social security (health insurance) rights. In a second ruling of 5 October 2007, the Constitutional Court extended social security (health insurance) benefits to same-sex couples, and in a ruling on 17 April 2008 pension rights were extended. With these three rulings, same-sex couples in Colombia now enjoy the main benefits as heterosexual couples under the same terms.

These three rulings by the Constitutional Court replaced the defeated civil union bill that was rejected in Congress. On 19 June 2007, the bill, which would have treated unregistered same-sex partners the same as unregistered opposite-sex partners in law, was defeated in Congress. Slightly different versions of the bill passed in each house, and President Álvaro Uribe indicated he would support it. A compromise bill then passed one house but failed in the other. The bill was defeated by a bloc of conservative senators. The bill, which had been endorsed by President Álvaro Uribe, would have made Colombia the first nation in Latin America to grant same-sex couples in long-term relationships the same rights to health insurance, inheritance and social security as heterosexual couples. However, with the rulings of the Constitutional Court, same-sex couples today enjoy the same rights that this failed bill would have given them.

In July 2011, the Constitutional Court ruled in a landmark decision that same-sex couples have the right to marry in Colombia. The Colombian Congress had to create an equivalent of marriage for same-sex couples by 20 June 2013, or else couples would automatically gain the right to go to any judge or public notary to formalise their union, according to the ruling. As the Colombia Congress failed to pass a same-sex marriage bill by that date, the courts instead began approving marriages themselves. The issue of same-sex marriage once again came before the Constitutional Court in 2015 after the country's Inspector General requested that the Court invalidate all the same-sex marriages approved in Colombia. A hearing took place in July 2015.

In March 2016, the first same-sex marriage conducted abroad was registered in Colombia and the National Registry issued a memo to all notaries and registrars ordering them to register same-sex marriages performed outside the country. Same-sex couples married abroad are now entitled to the same visa, healthcare benefits, inheritance and pension rights as heterosexual spouses once they take a stamped marriage certificate and identification papers to the nearest designated office.

On 28 April 2016, the Constitutional Court voted 6–3 in favor of same-sex marriage, holding that banning such unions is unconstitutional and discriminatory. The ruling effectively grants same-sex couples the right to marry as it orders all judges and notaries to grant the couples marriage licenses. The first same-sex wedding in the country happened in Cali on 24 May 2016.

Adoption and parenting

In May 2012, the Constitutional Court issued a ruling in favour of the adoption of two children to the American, Chandler Burr, who was going to lose custody because the ICBF (the institution responsible for carrying out adoption procedures; Instituto Colombiano de Bienestar Familiar) considered that he was hiding his sexual orientation. Since then, the ICBF cannot ask the sexual orientation of a person when they wish to adopt individually. Since 2014, LGBT individuals can adopt the biological child of their partner.

On 4 November 2015, the Constitutional Court ruled 6–2 in favour of full same-sex adoption rights. The court instructed adoption agencies not to discriminate against same-sex couples when providing adoption services. Opponents of the ruling said they would try to overturn it. By 31 March 2016, a campaign wanting to force a referendum on adoption rights for same-sex couples had gathered 1.8 million signatures, including 45 members of Congress. The campaign aimed to repeal the Constitutional Court ruling issued in November 2015. However, first, the signatures would have to be accepted by Colombia's Registrar, then the proposal would go to Congress where it would have to be debated and passed by a majority in both its chambers, twice. Finally, the proposal would have to also be approved by the Constitutional Court, the very court whose authority it sought to challenge. In May 2017, a Congress committee decided, in a 20–12 vote, to shelve the proposal. The move was applauded by President Juan Manuel Santos, who had previously announced his opposition to the proposal.

Legal registration of children
On 12 November 2015, the Constitutional Court ruled that same-sex couples must be allowed to register newborn children in both parents' names, with birth certificates listing two mothers or two fathers. In a 5–2 decision, the court gave the national civil registry 30 days to change its forms so that children can be registered to same-sex couples. The case was brought by two gay men who were unable to register their newborn twins. Local media reported that the babies were born in the United States to a surrogate mother. They reportedly received US citizenship and documents but could not be registered in Colombia.

Discrimination protections
In 2011, Congress passed a bill that penalises discrimination based on sexual orientation. The law established imprisonment for one to three years and economic fines for people who discriminate against different groups including the LGBT community.

The law also states that penalties are increased when discrimination is executed in a public space, when it is carried out through mass media, if the act is carried out by a public official, when acts based on discrimination deprives someone of their labour rights or in the provision of a public service. The penalty is reduced if the person who committed the act of discrimination apologizes publicly.

Discrimination in schools
In August 2014, a student named Sergio Urrego committed suicide as a result of discrimination by his teachers. His mother filed a lawsuit that after several appeals finally reached the Constitutional Court. The Court ruled in favour of Urrego's family, stating that the rights to dignity, education, equality, non-discrimination, the free development of personality, privacy and due process, justice, reparation and good name had been violated. The court also ordered the school to make a public act of forgiveness and ordered the Ministry of Education that within a year it review the "manuals of coexistence" (rules governing relationships between students themselves and others members of the educational community) of all schools in the country so that they do not contain articles that discriminate against children because of their sexual orientation or gender identity. With this decision, schools across the country cannot discriminate against students because of their sexual orientation.

Government decree
The Colombian Ministry of Interior released in the spring of 2016 a presidential decree that provides a broad policy of procedural obligations for government institutions and territorial entities regarding LGBTI rights. The document calls for creating an Intersectional Commission for the Guarantee of Rights of the LGBTI Community. The decree specifically addresses rights for LGBTI Colombians in public education, health care, prisons and as victims of armed conflict. The text clarifies that "national entities may not refuse to recognize that a same-sex couple can constitute a family, and in consequence, can enjoy the constitutional protections and equality of opportunities afforded other families."

In May 2018, President Juan Manuel Santos issued an executive decree ordering the Interior Ministry to further guarantee the rights of LGBT people in the social sector, notably in health, education, work, housing, recreation, sports and culture, as well as establishing support programmes.

Gender identity and expression
In 2011, the Constitutional Court ruled that a transgender woman prisoner was allowed to choose her own hairstyle and makeup.

In 2012, the Constitutional Court ruled that a transgender person could request to change their gender on their civil registry records without going through a family court. Previously, since 1970, the National Civil Registry (Registro del Estado Civil) had required a notarized, published statement, or a judge's ruling to change any information in a person's registry.

Constitutional Court rulings in 2012, and 2014 allow name changes to be performed more than once.

In response to two rulings of the Constitutional Court in 2015, the Colombian Government issued a decree on 4 June 2015 to simplify the process by which adults over 18 can legally change their gender. The decree, signed by the Ministry of Justice and the Ministry of the Interior, says the gender change is justified by a person's individual choice; it eliminates the requirement for psychiatric or physical examinations.

Notaries and local authorities sometimes believe they have discretionary authority to make their own rules, although officially this is not true. A 2016 report mentioned a pending legal case in which a person had been unable to find any notary willing to change their name without also changing their sex, even though the law allows this. The report, Cartografía de derechos trans en Colombia, was published jointly by OutRight Action International, El Aquelarre Trans, a transgender advocacy coalition, and El Programa de Acción por la Igualdad y la Inclusión Social (PAIIS), a program at the law school of Universidad de los Andes that researches and communicate information about human rights. This same 2016 report also recommended ending the psychiatric pathologization of transgender identity and abandoning sterilization as a prerequisite for other physical changes.

On February 4, 2022, the Constitutional Court ordered the Ninth Notary of Medellín and the National Civil Registry to provide a non-binary individual with a birth certificate and national identity document, respectively, with "no binario" or "NB" in the sex field. In addition, the court ordered the Colombian government to facilitate the inclusion of such markers in identity documents and ordered Congress to amend laws as needed to take non-binary individuals into consideration.

Organizations 
Among the significant organizations for transgender rights are:

 La Fundación GAAT (Grupo de Acción y Apoyo a Personas con Experiencias de Vida Trans). The organization's director, Laura Weinstein, who had worked with the organization since 2009, died on 2 January 2021 after suffering sudden respiratory problems during the COVID-19 pandemic.
 La Red Comunitaria Trans. It was founded in 2012 by Daniela Maldonado Salamanca.

Right to express affection in public
The Constitutional Court of Colombia has issued multiple rulings that protect the right of homosexuals and bisexuals to express themselves in public, including the right to express affection or love for their partners. In 1994, the court disapproved of the National Council of Television's refusal to show a commercial which featured a same-sex couple. This ruling was followed by others such as T-268 of 2000, where the court permitted a gay pride parade, which had previously been prevented by the Mayor of Neiva; T-301 of 2004, which ordered the Santa Marta police to stop harassing homosexuals who visited the boardwalk of the city; and T-314 of 2011, which held the Tequendama Hotel's refusal to allow access to some homosexuals to two events that were held in its facilities as discriminatory.

Sentence T-909 of 2011 ordered guardianship officials of Cosmocentro mall in Cali and its security firm to conduct a course to learn not to repress homosexuals when they express their affection in public.

Military service
Men, regardless of sexual orientation, must register for the draft at age 18, upon which they receive a registration card ["libreta militar"] that they may be asked to present in certain situations, for example, when seeking employment (only public entreprises). Transgender women are not required to register.

Gender identity 
According to a Supreme Court decision in 2015, transgender women do not have to register for the draft, but they may serve in the military if they choose.

Sexual orientation 
In 1999, the Constitutional Court established that gays and bisexuals can serve in the Colombian military and that sexual orientation cannot be a factor to prevent someone from entering the military. Judgment C-507 of 1999 declared the military rule prohibiting "homosexual acts" to be unconstitutional.

As of 2020—according to Samuel Rivera-Paéz, the author of Militares e identidad—military culture still discourages discussion of same-sex attraction. There are politics of "se puede ser, pero no demostrar" [you can exist, but not show off], similar to what is referred to in English as "don't ask, don't tell".

Blood donation
In 2012, the Constitutional Court found that one's sexual orientation cannot be a criterion for preventing blood donation. For this purpose, the court ordered the Ministry of Health and Social Protection to change the donation regulations, which established that men who have sex with men could not donate blood. The court ordered the Ministry of Health that regulations must be addressed to verify and identify high or low levels of risk according to the sexual behavior of the person and that sexual orientation is not in itself a de facto risk.

Social conditions

According to a report in The Washington Post, Bogotá and Medellín have thriving gay neighbourhoods, bars whose patrons are openly gay and centres that provide counselling and legal advice to members of the LGBT community. Local politicians, among them former Mayor Luis Eduardo Garzón and prominent members of Congress such as Senator Armando Benedetti, have supported granting legal rights to same-sex couples. Former President Juan Manuel Santos has shown support for LGBT rights, having two openly gay ministers in his government. Additionally, the mainstream media has a comprehensive coverage of the LGBT community. In the last few years, gay characters have appeared in more and more television programs and soap operas, especially a gay love scene in the prime-time soap opera Dr Mata and a lesbian scene in the series A corazón abierto. Despite support from the media, the government, several politicians, change in laws giving equal rights to homosexuals and transgender people and a more open debate about LGBT rights, Colombian society is still generally conservative on this issue.

In October 2019, an Invamer poll showed that support for same-sex marriage had, for the first time ever in Colombia, reached 50%, with 47% opposing. As for same-sex adoption, acceptance was at 36% and opposition at 62%. Previously, opinion surveys had found that a minority of Colombians supported same-sex marriage. A poll conducted between November and December 2016 showed that support for same-sex marriage was 37%, while 59% were against. Support for same-sex adoption was only 22%, while 76% were against. Another 2016 poll showed support for same-sex marriage at 40% and 57% opposed.

In May 2015, PlanetRomeo, an LGBT social network, published its first Gay Happiness Index (GHI). Gay men from over 120 countries were asked about how they feel about society's view on homosexuality, how do they experience the way they are treated by other people and how satisfied are they with their lives. Colombia was ranked 38th with a GHI score of 51.

In October 2019, Claudia López Hernández became the first openly gay person to serve as mayor of Bogotá, in an election labelled by the National Civil Registry as "the most peaceful in recent history". Lopez married Senator Angélica Lozano Correa in December 2019. In addition, two openly LGBT people were elected to Congress: Andrés Cancimance representing Putumayo and Oriana Zambrano representing La Guajira. Several candidates were also elected as local council members in Cali, Medellín, San Rafael, Pereira and more.

Several festivals and events cater to the LGBT community. These include pride parades in Bogotá, Medellín, Cali, Barranquilla, Bucaramanga, Cúcuta and Sincelejo, among others. Other events are the Rumours Festival in Cartagena, a music festival held in June, and Bogotá's Halloween Fiesta. Barranquilla's Carnival, one of the biggest carnivals in the world, includes a gay parade. Various other outlets catering to the LGBT community have been established over the years, including the emergence of new public-facing online publications such as OutinColombia.com and egoCity Magazine.

Summary table

See also
 
 Colombia Diversa
 Human rights in Colombia
 Intersex rights in Colombia
 LGBT rights in the Americas

References

External links
 Official website of Colombia Diversa. (in Spanish)
 Official website of LGBT Uniandino. (in Spanish)
 Partido Socialista Español (PSOE) – Apoyos Politicos a la causa gay lesbica en Colombia (Spanish Socialist Party news article on political supporters of gay and lesbian rights in Colombia)